Michigan Jewish Institute (MJI) was a Jewish-sponsored independent institution of higher and professional education in the Metro Detroit, Michigan area. Its administrative office were in Southfield, Michigan and its primary campus was in West Bloomfield Township. The institute was located at the 45-acre Campus of Living Judaism, which is affiliated with the Chabad-Lubavitch movement.

In March 2016 the U.S. Department of Education denied its recertification of the school, no longer allowing it to access federal financial aid. The institute immediately suspended the majority of its operations.

See also
 History of the Jews in Metro Detroit

References

External links
 Official website

Educational institutions established in 1994
Jews and Judaism in Michigan
Orthodox Jewish universities and colleges
Universities and colleges in Detroit
1994 establishments in Michigan
2016 disestablishments in Michigan
Educational institutions disestablished in 2016